Daryl Homer (born July 16, 1990) is an American right-handed saber fencer, three-time Olympian, and 2016 individual Olympic silver medalist.

Homer competed in the 2012 London Olympic Games, the 2016 Rio de Janeiro Olympic Games, and the 2020 Tokyo Olympic Games.

Homer is an eight-time team Pan American champion and three-time individual Pan American champion.

Personal life
Homer was born on St. Thomas, U.S. Virgin Islands, to Juliette Smith and Daryl Homer. At the age of five, Homer moved to New York City with his mother and younger sister D’Meca, to an apartment on Gun Hill Road in the Bronx. Homer attended Public School 21 there before going to Salesian High School in New Rochelle. He eventually graduated from St. John’s University, with a degree in advertising communications. He now works for advertising and marketing agency Anomaly.

Homer speaks to inner city youth about balancing his career with his athletic passions. He is a brand ambassador at Fencing in the Schools, a non-profit that aims to enrich the lives of students in the inner city through fencing. The program focuses on the health benefits, life skills, and exposure fencing can provide students in impoverished neighborhoods.

Fencing career

Homer started fencing at the age of 11, after happening on a picture of a masked fencer in the dictionary, and finding it "very cool". He joined the Peter Westbrook Foundation in New York City, a program  dedicated to exposing inner city youth to fencing started by six-time Olympian and 1984 Olympic bronze medalist Peter Westbrook. Homer chose saber because Westbrook himself had been a sabreur.

Homer was quickly identified as a talented athlete, and began working with four-time Olympic coach Yury Gelman immediately. He won a bronze medal at the 2007 Cadet World Fencing Championships, and another bronze at the 2009 Junior World Championships in Belfast. That same year he competed in his first senior World Championships in Antalya, finishing 23rd, and took the NCAA title as a sophomore.

In the 2009–10 season Homer defended successfully his NCAA title. At the 2010 World Championships in Paris he defeated successively France's Boladé Apithy and Nicolas Lopez to reach the round of 16, and finished 12th. The next season, he won the gold medal at the 2011 Pan American Championships.

He redshirted the following season to train for the 2012 Summer Olympics, for which he qualified as a member of the top-ranked team of the Americas zone. In the individual event he defeated 15–9 Romania's Tiberiu Dolniceanu in the first round, then had a narrow 15–14 victory of world No. 2, Russia's Aleksey Yakimenko. He lost 15–14 in the quarter-finals to another Romanian, Rareș Dumitrescu, and finished sixth. In the team event, the USA lost to Russia in the quarter-finals and finished eighth. He finished the 2011–12 season no. 12 in FIE rankings.

Homer maintained this ranking in the next season thanks to three quarter-final placings in the World Cup and a bronze medal at the 2013 Pan American Championships. He placed 11th at the end of the 2013–14 season. In the 2014–15 season he climbed his first World Cup podium with a bronze medal in the Seoul Grand Prix.

As of July 1, 2016, he was ranked #2 in the United States, behind Team USA  teammate Eli Dershwitz.

He competed for the United States in fencing at the 2016 Summer Olympics. He won the silver medal. He became the first U.S. medalist in men's saber since Peter Westbrook won a bronze medal in 1984 and the first U.S. men's silver medalist since William Grebe in 1904. The U.S. has never won gold in men's saber. Shortly after his Olympic silver medal, he left long-time coach Yury Gelman and the Manhattan Fencing Center for another coach.

He qualified to represent the United States in fencing at the 2020 Olympics in Tokyo in 2021.

Medal record

Olympic Games

World Championship

Pan American Championship

Grand Prix

World Cup

See also
List of USFA Division I National Champions

References

External links
 
 Fencing in the Schools program
 Facebook Profile

American male sabre fencers
Living people
1990 births
Fencers at the 2012 Summer Olympics
Fencers at the 2016 Summer Olympics
Fencers at the 2015 Pan American Games
People from Saint Thomas, U.S. Virgin Islands
Sportspeople from the Bronx
Olympic silver medalists for the United States in fencing
Medalists at the 2016 Summer Olympics
American people of United States Virgin Islands descent
Pan American Games medalists in fencing
Pan American Games gold medalists for the United States
Friends Seminary alumni
St. John's University (New York City) alumni
Medalists at the 2015 Pan American Games
Fencers at the 2020 Summer Olympics